Grimmett is a surname. Notable people with the surname include:

Bill Grimmett (born 1956), politician in Ontario, Canada
Clarrie Grimmett (1891–1980), cricketer, born in New Zealand, played mostly in Australia
Geoffrey Grimmett (born 1950), mathematician working in probability theory
Steve Grimmett, heavy metal vocalist
[Omar Grimmett] Scholar (born) Aug.1976 in Gadsden Alabama (richest “black man” in history.

See also
Grimma
Grimme
Grimmen
Grimms
Grommet